Walter Henry Hannam (1885–1965) was an Australian wireless experimenter, a founding member of the Wireless Institute of Australia, wireless operator and mechanic on the Australasian Antarctic Expedition, a member of the ANZAC Wireless Company in World War I, and tireless promoter of amateur radio in the 1920s.

Early life and family
Hannam was born in 1885 in Burwood, New South Wales. He studied at the Sydney Technical College and was awarded a diploma in science. He was a founding member of the Wireless Institute of Australia.

Wireless experiments

Antarctic expeditioner
Hannam was selected as part of the Australasian Antarctic Expedition. He helped to set up the wireless equipment on the Macquarie Islands. He is credited with being the first person to establish wireless contact with Australia from Antarctica. He set up the wireless equipment at the main base and remained at Cape Denison as wireless operator for two summers and one winter. On his departure in February 1913, Sidney Jeffryes took over his post as wireless operator.

Military service
Circa 1910, Hannam was closely involved with Captain George Augustine Taylor in a number of successful demonstrations to the military as to the potential uses of wireless telegraphy. Following the commencement of World War I, Hannam enlisted on 2 June 1915 in the Australian Imperial Forces, embarked for France and commenced duties in the field workshops. He was a large man and struggled with a number of medical issues. But his previous wireless experience was identified and he was transferred to the ANZAC Wireless Coy. The Wireless Coy. was eventually renamed Australian Army Signal Corps. He was discharged on 7 November 1919. He served as an engineer in the Australian Motor Transport Corps.

Electrical business
After his war service, Hannam established an electrical business. He married Elizabeth Bielby in 1927. He died in 1965 in Terrigal.

Legacy
 Founding member of Wireless Institute of Australia, the world's oldest established national radio body.
 With Taylor, Kirkby and Wilkinson, participated in early demonstration of wireless in Australian military.
 Hannam is credited as being the first person to play football on the Antarctic mainland.
 First use of wireless on Macquarie Island.
 First use of radio on Antarctica.
 In 1914 he was awarded the Polar Medal for his work on the expedition. 
 The Hannam Islands, a group of three islands in Commonwealth Bay is named for him. 
 The Australian Antarctic Divisions’ Walter Hannam Building honours his achievements.
 Awarded patent for "Improvements in rapid type electric water heaters for bath and other domestic service", subsequently successfully marketed

References

Further reading
 Australian Antarctic Division. Walter Henry Hannam (1885–1965) online
 Australian Antarctic Division. Home of the Blizzard, Walter Henry Hannam (Webpage) Online
 Australian Antarctic Data Centre. Gazetteer, Hannam Islands (Webpage) Online
 Ayres, Philip. Mawson: a life (1st ed. Melbourne, 1999) Trove NLA Google Books
 Carty, Bruce. Australian Radio History (4th ed. Sydney, 2013) 
 Cormick, Craig. In Bed with Douglas Mawson: Travels Around Antarctica (New Holland Publishers, 2011) TroveGoogle Books
 Curnow, Geoffrey Ross. The history of the development of wireless telegraphy and broadcasting in Australia to 1942, with especial reference to the Australian Broadcasting Commission: a political and administrative study. online
 Friends of Mawson. Friends of Mawson. (Website) Online (excellent reading list and newsletter archive)
 Mawson, Douglas. The home of the blizzard : an Australian hero's classic tale of Antarctic discovery and adventure (Unabridged, two volumes), (W. Heinemann, London, 1915 ) Trove NLA
 Mawson, Douglas. The home of the blizzard : an Australian hero's classic tale of Antarctic discovery and adventure (Abridged, one volume) (Wakefield Press, Adelaide, 2010) Trove NLA
 Mawson, Douglas. The home of the blizzard : an Australian hero's classic tale of Antarctic discovery and adventure (Electronic edition)   Online (Includes full PDF)
 Ross, John F. Radio Broadcasting Technology, 75 Years of Development in Australia 1923–1998 (J. F. Ross, 1998) 
 Wireless Institute of Australia (editor Wolfenden, Peter). Wireless Men & Women at War, Article 1, Walter Hannam (Wireless Institute of Australia, Melbourne, 2017)

External links
Walter Hannam's diaries from the Australasian Antarctic Expedition

Explorers of Antarctica
1885 births
1965 deaths
Australasian Antarctic Expedition
Australian military personnel of World War I